Martin Buček (born May 7, 1986) is a Czech former professional ice hockey forward.

Buček played eleven games for HC Vítkovice of the Czech Extraliga. He also spent one season in the Western Hockey League with the Portland Winter Hawks, who drafted him 28th overall in the 2004 CHL Import Draft. He scored just two goals in 38 games for the team.

Buček also played in the Polska Liga Hokejowa for TH Unia Oświęcim and KTH Krynica.

References

External links

1986 births
Living people
Czech ice hockey forwards
SHK Hodonín players
SK Horácká Slavia Třebíč players
KTH Krynica players
Portland Winterhawks players
Sportspeople from Ostrava
HC RT Torax Poruba players
TH Unia Oświęcim players
HC Vítkovice players
Czech expatriate ice hockey players in the United States
Czech expatriate sportspeople in Poland
Expatriate ice hockey players in Poland